Stara Kornica  is a village in Łosice County, Masovian Voivodeship, in east-central Poland. It is the seat of the gmina (administrative district) called Gmina Stara Kornica.

The village has a population of approximately 1,000.

References

Stara Kornica
Siedlce Governorate
Kholm Governorate
Lublin Voivodeship (1919–1939)